Pogostemon formosanus is a plant species in the family Lamiaceae, first described in 1896. The species is endemic to the island of Taiwan.

Pogostemon formosanus are herbs or suffruticose plants, growing up to 1 m tall and covered with septate hairs; the stems are erect, round or square, and glabrous or sparsely and minutely hairy.

References

formosanus
Endemic flora of Taiwan
Plants described in 1896
Taxa named by Daniel Oliver